Bigg Boss 11, also known as Bigg Boss 11: Padosi Bajayenge Barah, is the 11th season of Indian reality TV series Bigg Boss, which aired on Colors TV. Salman Khan returned to host the show for the 8th time. It premiered on 1 October 2017. The grand finale of the show took place on 14 January 2018 and Shilpa Shinde was announced as the winner while Hina Khan as the runner-up.

This was the second season of Bigg Boss to appear on Voot. Like the previous season, viewers are offered extension properties such as Unseen Undekha, Cutless and a new weekend special, Bigg Buzz. For the first time, the voting could only be done via Voot.

Arshi Khan and Vikas Gupta returned as Challengers in Bigg Boss 14 whereas Hina Khan returned as a Senior in the same season.

Production

Eye Logo
The eye had two colours this time - white and yellow. The lens was separately situated at the center of the eye. The eye was sliced into two parts diagonally having cracks in both sides.

House
The house had a "padosi" theme which referred to neighbour in English. New sections called Aakhara (activity area) and Kalkothri (jail) were introduced for the first time.

Housemates status

Housemates 
The participants in the order of appearance and entered in house are:

Original Entrants
Hiten Tejwani – TV/Film actor. Hiten is remembered for his roles in Kyunki Saas Bhi Kabhi Bahu Thi, Kasautii Zindagii Kay & Gangaa.
Luv Tyagi – Model, civil engineer from Delhi.
Mehjabi Siddiqui – Housewife.
Lucinda Nicholas – Australian model, actress and yoga instructor. She made her debut in the Bollywood film Boss featured Akshay Kumar and Yo Yo Honey Singh in the popular song "Party All Night". In 2016, she played a cameo role in Ekta Kapoor's show Pardes Mein Hai Mera Dil.
Sabyasachi Satpathy – TV host, dancer, designer.
Sapna Choudhary – A famous Haryanvi dancer.
Sshivani Durga – Self-styled God woman.
Priyank Sharma – Dancer, model, reality TV star. Priyank is known for participating in MTV Roadies and MTV Splitsvilla (2017).
VJ Benafsha Soonawalla – MTV VJ, model.  Benafsha is a VJ who was one of the contestants on MTV Roadies (2015).
Akash Dadlani – Rapper and is related to singer Vishal Dadlani.
Jyoti Kumari – Student from Bihar.
Bandgi Kalra – Model and software engineer.
Arshi Khan – Model, actress and dancer.
Hina Khan – TV actress. Hina is known for her role as Akshara Singhania in Yeh Rishta Kya Kehlata Hai. She was a contestant and first runner-up in Fear Factor: Khatron Ke Khiladi (2017).
Puneesh Sharma – Reality TV star. He is the winner of the reality show Sarkaar Ki Duniya (2009).
Vikas Gupta – Producer. Vikas was known as the head of channels MTV India and &TV. He was also the head creative producer of the show Kis Desh Mein Hai Meraa Dil.
Shilpa Shinde – Television actress. Shilpa is known for her role as Angoori Bhabhi in Bhabiji Ghar Par Hain!
Zubair Khan

Wild Card Entrants

Dhinchak Pooja – Singer.

Special episodes

Guest appearances

Weekly summary

Nominations table 

Color Key
  indicates that the Housemate was directly nominated for eviction.
  indicates that the Housemate was immune prior to nominations.
  indicates the winner.
  indicates the first runner up.
  indicates the second runner up.
  indicates the third runner up.
  indicates the contestant has been evicted.
  indicates the contestant walked out due to emergency.
  indicates the contestant has been ejected.
  house captain.
  indicates the contestant is nominated.

Nomination notes 
 :  This housemate was the current member of Padosi (Neighbour) and could not be nominated for eviction through the standard nomination process that week. Their identity was hidden from non-members.
 : The Padosis (Neighbours) were given a special power to save one nominated housemate and directly nominated 2 housemates. They saved Hina and nominated Arshi and Bandgi.
 : The Padosis (Neighbours) were given a special power to directly nominate one housemate and they chose Jyoti.
 : The Padosis (Neighbours) failed to complete the secret task. As a punishment, all of them was directly nominated for Instant Ejection. All housemates excluding Captain Vikas, voted to eject 1 Padosi housemate.
 : The Captain got a special power to nominate seven housemates. However, Voting Lines are closed so therefore no eviction took place.
 : Housemates could only choose two housemates for nomination between the seven nominated housemates by Captain Vikas. Housemates not chosen by the captain were hence rendered immune.
 : In this Nominations Bigg Boss himself Nominated Arshi, Bandgi, Mehjabi, Puneesh, Shilpa and Vikas, who were the victims of not following the House Rules. Pooja was exempted from nominations as it was her first week.
 : Bigg Boss asked the nominated housemates to hold the hand of saved housemates and if they leave their hand they would be saved and the saved housemates will get nominated but if they hold their hand until half an hour, they would remain nominated and the saved housemates will remain save.
 : The pairs were Arshi and Benafsha, Bandgi and Luv, Mehjab and Jyoti, Puneesh and Sapna, Shilpa and Hiten, Vikas and Sabyasachi. Arshi, Bandgi, Mehjabi and Puneesh left their respective partner's hand and nominated them and themselves got saved. Shilpa and Vikas did not leave their partner's hand thus saving their partner and themselves got nominated.
 : Bigg Boss asked Hina, the house captain, to hold Akash's hand. If she leaves his hand, he will get nominated but if she doesn't, both of them would be saved from nominations. Hina decided to leave Akash's hand.
 : Bigg Boss made seven pairs that were Hiten and Priyank, Sapna and Vikas, Pooja and Arshi, Benafsha and Bandgi, Akash and Shilpa, Hina and Puneesh, Mehjabi and Sabyasachi and they were asked to tell the name of the housemate who will get nominated by mutual consent. The other person would be saved from nominations. If they were not able to decide in the given time, both of them will get nominated.
 : Hiten, Sapna, Pooja, Shilpa, Hina and Sabyasachi decided to get nominated. Benafsha and Bandgi did not decide and both them got themselves nominated.
 : Bigg Boss asked all the pairs not to tell anything about nominations to any other contestant until bigg boss announced it himself. Priyank, after coming out from the confession room, appealed to his fans to save Hiten, thus violating the rule. Bigg Boss nominated him himself.
 : Shilpa was granted immunity by Tanisha Mukherjee, Karanvir Bohra and Sweta Singh by the winning the task of Secrets.
 : Benafsha violated the rule by getting physical with Akash, in the previous week. Bigg Boss directly nominated her himself for this week, while Hina got pull back from being save for this week after Removing the ZERO tattoo made on Luv's Forehead which was made to save her as bigg boss told to not to apply any makeup or try to clean during nomination process.
 : Appy Fizz feel the fizz Nominations for this Nominations, there was Appy Fizz safe zone in the garden. The members with the membership will be save from this week's nominations. At the end of six buzzers Vikas, Hiten, Arshi and Luv had the membership. And were safe from this Nominations.
 : Akash saved himself by using his Safety Shield which was given by Gauahar Khan in Week 4.
 : Captain Bandgi had a special power to save one unsafe housemate, she saved Puneesh.
 : That was the first ever regular nominations held in this season as contestant goes to confession room to give two names.
 : Housemates saved one housemate each. Captain got a special power to save one nominated housemate and directly nominate one safe housemate.
 : Both the nominated contestants were declared safe thus there was No eviction as the voting lines were closed.
 : Housemates were nominated due to failing in task by having a low number of apples on their tree.
 : Hiten and Priyank got the fewest votes in the public votes. As a twist, housemates had to vote to save one housemate.
 : Bigg Boss himself nominated the entire housemates except Hina for discussing the nomination thus violating the house rule.
 : Two housemates with the fairest time from 42 mins were, Luv was 9 mins 55 seconds late (i.e., pressed the button after 51:55 mins) and Priyank was 10 mins 57 seconds early (i.e., pressed the button after 31:03 mins). Therefore, Priyank and Luv were Nominated for Eviction.

References

External links 

 Official Website

2017 Indian television seasons
2018 Indian television seasons
11